Tara Tarini Temple is a famous Hindu shrine of Adi Shakti on Kumari hills (other names of the hill is Purnagiri, Ratnagiri, Tarini Parvat) at the bank of river Rushikulya near Purushottampur in Ganjam district of Odisha. Maa Tara Tarini is worshiped as the Breast Shrine (Sthana Peetha) of Adi Shakti  Sati Devi here. The temple is one of the oldest pilgrimage centers of Mother goddesses and one of the four major Shakti Peethas and Tantra Peethas of India.

Abode of Tara Tarini
Adi Shakti Maa Tara Tarini have been regarded as the presiding deity (Ista-Devi) in many households in Odisha. This holy shrine is in the eastern coast, about 30 km from the commercial nerve centre of Odisha, Brahmapur. The historically famous Jaugada Rock Edict of Emperor Ashoka and the pious river Rushikulya, which has been described in Rig Veda as Gangayah Jyestha Bhagini (the elder sister of the Ganga), are also present near this shrine enhancing its religious and cultural significance.

Since time immemorial, Adyashakti is being worshiped here as Devi Tara Tarini on the blue capped holy mountain of Tarini Parvat/Kumari hills/Ratnagiri/Purnagiri. At the hilltop, a beautiful stone temple is the abode of Maa. Two stones anthropomorphized by the addition of gold and silver ornaments and shaped to be seen as human faces are the main shrine of this temple which represent the goddesses Tara and Tarini. In between them are two fully celebrated and beautiful brass heads as their Chalanti Pratima or their Living Image.

About Shakti Peetha 

The shrine is considered one of the most revered Shakti Peethas & Tantra Peethas and major pilgrimage centres of Shakta(Shaktism)sect of Hinduism. Shakti Peethas are holy abodes of Parashakti. This is believed to have originated from the historical story, of falling of the body parts of the corpse of Sati Devi, when Shiva carried it and wandered. There are 51 Shakti Peethas and 26 Upa Peethas spread across the Indian sub-continent. 51 Shakti Peethas are believed to be representing the 51 letters in Sanskrit alphabet. Sati Devi's breasts are believed to have fallen here in Tara Tarini. The Shakti of the shrine is addressed as Maa Tara Devi.

The origin of Shakti Peethas are related to the history of Daksha yajña and Sati's self-immolation. The Shakti Peetha shrines lead to the development of Shaktism in India.

Four Adi Shakti Peethas
Religious texts including the Shiva Purana, the Kalika Purana (the Asthashakti), and the Devi Bhagavata and Tantric texts like Hevajra Tantra, Sthana-nirupana Tantra and many more Tantras recognize the four major Shakti Peethas. 
 
As per famous Puranas;
Like the Kalika Purana  says, (Vimala, Pada Khanda) inside the Jagannath Temple, Puri, Odisha, (Tara Tarini, Sthana Khanda), near Purushottampur, Odisha, (Kamakhya, Yoni Khanda) near Guwahati, Assam and (Dakshina Kalika Kalighat, Mukha Khanda) in Kolkata, West Bengal originated from the limbs of the Corpse of Mata Sati. In a hymn, the Kalika Purana (Asthashakti) clearly says:

“Vimala Pada khandancha,
Stana khandancha Tarini (Tara Tarini),
Kamakhya Yoni khandancha,
Mukha khandancha Kalika (Kali)
Anga pratyanga sangena
Vishnu Chakra Kshate nacha……”Further explaining the importance of these four Peethas the Brihat Samhita gives the geographical location of these Peethas. For example:

“Rushikulya Tate Devi,
Tarakashya Mahagiri,
Tashya Srunge Stitha Tara,
Vasishta Rajitapara"

Four Adi Shakti Pithas are also part of 51 or 52 Shakti Pithas but they are four major parts of Devi Sati's body. So, they are important, powerful and believed as adi-shakti pithas)

History
It is known from the Mahabharata that, before the commencement of the Mahabharata war Lord Sri Krishna had advised Arjuna to offer prayer for victory at Shridevi Kupa or Bhadrakali. Bhadrakali originated from the limbs of Sati like the other four major Adi Shakti Peethas, which existed during the time of the Mahabharata or around 6000 years ago. This is the oldest data/information we get till date, regarding the existence of the shrines originated from the limbs of the divine corpse of Devi Sati.

According to available historical sources the fall of Kalingan Empire and its capital Sampa (Samapa) in the Kalinga war around 2300 years ago by Mauryan Emperor Ashoka, strengthened the grip of Buddhists in this part of India. The then Sampa was hardly 7 km from Tara Tarini Hill Shrine. So, scholars believe that Tara Tarini was worshiped as the principal deity (Ista-Devi) of the mighty Kalinga Empire. After Ashoka conquered Kalinga scholars found it a famous centre of Buddhism. The region of Ganjam near the bank of river Rushikulya was an active Buddhist site as shown from the Special Rock Edicts of Ashoka found at Jaugada at a distance of 4 km from Tara Tarini Hill Shrine. The name Tara (Buddhism), an important deity of Mahayana Buddhist Pantheon, is suggestive of Buddhist influence. An image of Buddha in meditation, present inside the sanctum sanctorum of the temple lends credence to the claim of this site as an ancient centre of the Buddhist Shakta cult.

According to the texts of Mahayana Buddhists, in the initial days, the Buddhists didn’t believe in the worship of Goddesses or in Pratimapuja (Idol Worship). But, the ecclesiastical texts of Mahayana’s reveal that from 1st century AD after the fall of Kalinga, for the first time the Mahayana Buddhists accepted the worship of Mother Goddess Tara. So there is seldom any doubt that the Buddhists have learned the Tara Puja concept from this shrine. The Bouddha Tantrik texts, texts of Vajrajani sect and Hindu Tantrik texts also attest these facts. Scholars believe that in the primary days the Buddhists worshiped Tara Tarini, the principal seat of Tantrik sect in Hinduism at that time, as Bouddha Tara, and later on included ‘Tara’ as the Tantrik deity or spouse of Bodhisattva Avalokiteshvara in their belief system. Gradually this ‘Tara’ worship spread to different parts of the world.

https://encrypted-tbn0.gstatic.com/images?q=tbn:ANd9GcTIMhilxCoWKked 6TWV8ruz4Lb-Q-kCS423Q&usqp=CAU

Besides the worship of Tara by the Buddhist Tantrikas, the maritime history of Kalinga suggests the worship of Tara by the Sadhavas, merchants and seamen before launching their sea voyage from the great sea ports like Dantapura (Gopalpur), Pallur near Chilika Lake, Kalingapatna and through river Rushikulya. All these major sea ports of the ancient world were very near the Tara Tarini hill shrine.

It is known from the available sources that till 17th century this place was out of the sight of the common man. But, according to a folk story, once Maa Tara Tarini appeared as two sisters in the house of Shri Basu Praharaj. He was a learned Brahmin of Kharida Vira Jagannathpur village in Ganjam District and one of the great devotees of the Mother Goddess but was childless. After staying for some years one day the sisters disappeared suddenly from the house of Basu Praharaj. According to the account of the villagers the sisters traveled up to the Tarini Parvat/Ratnagiri and disappeared there.

Basu Praharaj searched around but did not find their tracings. His heart broke down with grief and pain. On that night he saw a dream where the Tara and Tarini informed Basu Praharaj that they were not his daughters; they are the Adi Shakti, Tara and Tarini. The goddesses ordered Basu to come out of the grief and with full devotion renovate the temple on the hilltop of Tarini Parvat and establish the deities according to the Vedic tradition.

After that divine direction Basu discovered the tracings of ancient most presence of Adi Shakti Tara Tarini on the sacred hilltop and immediately took steps to reconstruct the temple and the shrine. Since that time for its magnetism and sanctity this Sthana Peetha (Breast Shrine) of Mata Sati, became a centre of faith and reverence for countless people, in search of peace, tranquility, guidance and spiritual energy and its fame spread like wild fire to become one of the popular religious destinations for millions of devotees.

Transport

Taxi services are available from Brahmapur, Bhubaneswar, Puri to Tara Tarini, and regular bus service is available from Brahmapur to the Tara Tarini Junction.

The nearest railway station is Brahmapur railway station, 32 km from the temple.

The nearest airports are Bhubaneswar (174 km) and Vishakhapatnam (240 km) from the shrine.

Chaitra Yatra
Chaitra Yatra/Chaitra Parba/Chaitra Mela is the most important festival across Odisha in various Mother Godesses shrines.

It takes place on every Tuesday of the Hindu month of Chaitra, i.e., during mid-March to mid-April (according to the English calendar). Lakhs of devotees gather here to have darshan of Maa Tara Tarini and perform their Manasika'' after fulfillment of their desires.

The shrine remains open for the Darshan of the deities from 1.00 AM (mid-night on Monday) till 11 PM (of Tuesday). During that period, Pahada (daytime rest) of the deities is confined to night-time only. Devotees come to offer the first bunch of hair of the newborn babies with the belief that goddesses Tara Tarini will protect the newborns from all evils and ensure their well-being.

Also in each Sankrati (1st day of solar Hindu month), special pujas are done in temple.

References

8. Know About The Three Major Shakti Peethas In Odisha,  October 21, 2020

9.Motherlodes of Power: The story of India's 'Shakti Peethas', New Indian Express, 03rd October 2021 

10.A Journey Through Famous Shakti Peeths In India, 15 October, 2020

11.The most famous temples in Odisha, June 23, 2021

12.Chaitra Mela of Goddess Tara Tarini in Ganjam district of Odisha, April 15, 2022

13. Odisha CM Naveen Patnaik seeks Tara Tarini blessings, dedicates revamped shrine, 19th May 2022, New Indian Express

14.Chaitra Yatra concludes at Tara Tarini, 13th April 2022, New Indian Express

External links

 Odisha Tourism
 Maa Taratarini, the living goddess of Ganjam
 Maa Taratarini Temple
 Taratarini sculptures
 तारातारिणी शक्तिपीठ एक ऐतिहासिक परिचय:  राम प्रसाद त्रिपाठी

Shakti Peethas
Hindu temples in Ganjam district
Shakti temples